Language, Meaning and Context is a 1981 book by Sir John Lyons in which the author tries to outline the state of play in semantics.

Reception
The book was reviewed by Goran Hammarstrom, Rajendra Singh and Jaime Bernal Leongomez.

References

External links
Language, Meaning and Context

1981 non-fiction books
Linguistics textbooks
Books in semantics
English-language books
French-language books